Minuscule 244 (in the Gregory-Aland numbering), ε 173 (Soden), is a Greek minuscule manuscript of the New Testament, on parchment. Paleographically it has been assigned to the 12th century.

Description 

The codex contains the text of the four Gospels on 274 parchment leaves (size ). The text is written in one column per page, 46 lines per page. The evangelical text is surrounded by a commentary of Euthymius Zigabenus.
It contains pictures.

Text 

The Greek text of the codex is a representative of the Byzantine text-type. Aland placed it in Category V.

It was not examined by using the Claremont Profile Method.

History 

Formerly the manuscript was held at Athos peninsula. The manuscript was brought to Moscow, by the monk Arsenius, on the suggestion of the Patriarch Nikon, in the reign of Alexei Mikhailovich Romanov (1645-1676). The manuscript was collated by C. F. Matthaei.

The manuscript is currently housed at the State Historical Museum (V. 88, S. 220) at Moscow.

See also 

 List of New Testament minuscules
 Biblical manuscript
 Textual criticism

References

Further reading 

 C. F. Matthei, Novum Testamentum Graece et Latine, (Riga, 1782-1788). (as n)
 Kurt Treu, Die Griechischen Handschriften des Neuen Testaments in der UdSSR; eine systematische Auswertung des Texthandschriften in Leningrad, Moskau, Kiev, Odessa, Tbilisi und Erevan, T & U 90 (Berlin, 1966), pp. 272–274.

Greek New Testament minuscules
12th-century biblical manuscripts